is a Japanese-American model who is affiliated with Isle management.

Hasegawa became a popular model when she was an exclusive model in the fashion magazine Vivi in 2005. She appeared in the magazine for eight years and appeared in the magazine, Glamorous, and has been active in the tarento industry.

Filmography

TV series

References

External links
 

Japanese female models
1986 births
Living people
Actresses from New Hampshire
Japanese people of American descent
People educated at Yokohama International School